Dig is an American thriller film directed by K. Asher Levin from a screenplay by Banipal and Benhur Ablakhad. The film stars Thomas Jane, his daughter Harlow Jane, Emile Hirsch and Liana Liberato.

Cast
 Thomas Jane as Scott Brennan
 Harlow Jane as Jane Brennan
 Emile Hirsch as Victor
 Liana Liberato as Lola

Production
Principal photography was set to begin in late April 2021, in Albuquerque, New Mexico. On April 20, 2021, it was announced that filming had begun in Las Cruces, New Mexico and Doña Ana County, New Mexico.

The casting of Hirsch and Liberato was announced in June 2021, but  the film is in post-production. That same month, it was announced that Screen Media Films acquired international distribution rights to the film. In November 2021, Saban Films acquired the distribution rights to the film.

Release
The film was released in theaters and on VOD on September 23, 2022.

References

External links
 

American horror films
Films shot in New Mexico